The Dive Lectures are a series of public lectures that have been hosted at the Royal Geographical Society in London every year since 2005 as part of an ongoing programme of events by the Society and the London Diving Chamber  to promote exploration and adventure sports. Featuring keynote presentations by well-known figures in diving, television, exploration, photography and environmentalism, the lectures have developed into a well-attended social and professional forum for the British scuba industry as well as a popular fund-raising occasion for diving-related charities.

Dive Lectures
The first Dive Lecture was inaugurated in March 2002 under the auspices of the London Diving Chamber which provides NHS-funded recompression to divers with Decompression Sickness (DCS) together with other Hyperbaric Oxygen Therapy (HBOT) treatments from its recompression chamber at The Hospital of St John & St Elizabeth in St. John's Wood, London.

Sometimes held annually, sometimes biannually, the lectures are free to attend but also act as fund-raising occasions for diving-related charities such as The Scuba Trust, an organisation helping divers with disabilities.

In 2005, the lectures took up their now regular venue at the RGS. Initially, they were held in the Map Room of Lowther Lodge, subsequent events have been held in the 500-seat auditorium, The Ondaatje Theatre.

Representative Speakers 2007-17
From its inception in 2002, the London Diving Chamber Annual Dive Lectures has attracted well-known figures from the diving world and celebrities interested in diving to speak to its audience. In its earliest years, the event was introduced by Loyd Grossman and Mariella Frostrup, and speakers included Paul Toomer, Phil Docking and Bob Cole. Since 2007 speakers have included:

References

British lecture series
Recreational diving
Royal Geographical Society